Alanosine (also called SDX-102) is a substance that has been studied for the treatment of pancreatic cancer. It is an antimetabolite. It is used as one of a few experimental treatments for patients with deadly pancreatic cancer when the main chemotherapeutic treatment regimen of gemcitabine is no longer useful.

References 

Antimetabolites
Amino acid derivatives
Nitrosamines
Experimental drugs
Toxic amino acids